Altaria is the brand name of a group of fast long-distance passenger railway services operated by Spanish national railway company Renfe Operadora and connecting Madrid to Algeciras, Alicante, Barcelona, Cádiz, Cartagena, Granada, Irún, Logroño, Murcia, Pamplona, and San Sebastián.

Altaria trains are composed of locomotive-hauled Talgo coaching stock equipped with gauge-changing technology which enables the carriages to run on both conventional track and the narrower international  track which is used for the newer high-speed network in Spain. Altaria trains are currently able to achieve speeds of up to 200 km/h on the high-speed lines.

Notes

Renfe
Regional rail in Spain